IT Professional is a bi-monthly peer-reviewed magazine published by the IEEE Computer Society for the developers and managers of enterprise information systems. Coverage areas include emerging technologies, Web services, Internet security, data management, enterprise architectures and infrastructures, software development, systems integration, and wireless networks. The magazine was established in January 1999 and celebrated twenty years in 2019. IT Professional has a 2019 impact factor of 3.7.

Editors-In-Chief
The following individuals are or have been editor-in-chief of the magazine:
 Irena Bojanova, 2018–present
 San Murugesan, 2014–2017
 Simon Y. Liu, 2010–2013
 Arnold Bragg, 2006–2009
 Frank E. Ferrante, 2002–2005
 Wushow (Bill) Chou, 1999-2001

References

External links
 
 DBLP bibliography (from 2004 volume 6)
 IEEE Computer Society

Publications established in 1999
IEEE magazines
Bimonthly journals
Information systems journals